Lecanactis is a genus of crustose lichens, commonly called old wood rimmed lichen. The genus was circumscribed in 1855 by German lichenologist Gustav Wilhelm Körber, who assigned Lecanactis abietina as the type species.

The mycobiont (fungus partner) is in the family Roccellaceae. The photobiont is an algae in the genus Trentepohlia.

Species

Lecanactis abietina 
Lecanactis borbonica 
Lecanactis canariensis 
Lecanactis citrina 
Lecanactis coniochlora 
Lecanactis latispora 
Lecanactis leprarica  – Cameroon
Lecanactis luteola 
Lecanactis malmideoides  – South America
Lecanactis minuta 
Lecanactis minutissima 
Lecanactis mollis 
Lecanactis neozelandica 
Lecanactis platygraphoides 
Lecanactis quassiae 
Lecanactis rubra  – Madagascar
Lecanactis spermatospora 
Lecanactis subdilleniana 
Lecanactis subfarinosa 
Lecanactis submollis 
Lecanactis sulphurea

References

Roccellaceae
Arthoniomycetes genera
Lichen genera
Taxa described in 1855
Taxa named by Gustav Wilhelm Körber